Peter John Durano Calderon (born March 27, 1961) is a Filipino politician and lawyer serving as the representative for the 7th district of Cebu since 2016. He served as mayor of Samboan, Cebu from 2001 to 2007 and as member of the Cebu Provincial Board representing the 2nd district from 2007 to 2016.

Education
Calderon earned his bachelor's degree in business economics and in laws at University of the Philippines Diliman. He then took up his master's in business management in University of the Philippines Cebu.

He placed 11th in the 1988 Philippine Bar Examination. He went on to complete the Program of Instructions for Lawyers at Harvard Law School in Massachusetts, United States in 1997.

Political career

Mayor of Samboan (2001–2007)
Calderon started his political career by serving as mayor of Samboan for two consecutive terms from 2001 to 2007.

Cebu Provincial Board (2007–2016)
Calderon ran for board member of Cebu's 2nd district in the 2007 elections and went on to be re-elected for three consecutive terms serving until 2016.

House of Representatives (2016–present)
Calderon ran for representative of Cebu's 7th district in the 2016 elections. The said district was re-created by virtue of Republic Act 10684 comprising the municipalities of Alcantara, Alegria, Badian, Dumanjug, Ginatilan, Malabuyoc, Moalboal, and Ronda. He defeated Pablo John Garcia, who previously ran against then-Governor Hilario Davide III in the 2013 elections.

He ran for re-election in the 2019 elections and won against then-Dumanjug mayor Nelson Garcia.

He is currently serving as the Vice Chairperson of the Committee on Appropriations.

Electoral history

House of Representatives

References

External links
 
 Congressional Profile

1961 births
People from Cebu
Members of the House of Representatives of the Philippines from Cebu
Nationalist People's Coalition politicians
University of the Philippines Diliman alumni
University of the Philippines Cebu alumni
Living people
Cebuano people
20th-century Filipino lawyers
Members of the Cebu Provincial Board
21st-century Filipino politicians